Rudy Poat is a creative director and designer. He is known for his work on The Matrix franchise working in special effects. Before working on The Matrix, Poat also worked on special effects for What Dreams May Come (film) that helped lead the companies Mass Illusion and Manex to several Academy Awards.

Early life and education
Poat was born in Salisbury Rhodesia, now Zimbabwe and was raised in Netherlands. Poat attended Syracuse University.

Career
After The Matrix, Poat joined Giant Studios, a start up company at the time, as a Creative Director and worked to position the company in virtual production. Poat was the technical director of FIFA (video game series) games at Electronic Arts. He has incubated various new IP game title and prototypes. 
Poat then served as Microsoft's Creative Director of Xbox incubation. He was instrumental in the formation of Analog Labs, where he helped to develop HoloLens. Poat developed the technology around SmartGlass and also worked with innovative ideas centered around genetic living search algorithms. At Microsoft Poat then went on to work on Bing to innovate ideas around smart search and machine learning.

Poat and John Gaeta worked as partners since The Matrix, returning to real time cinema. The duo experimented by inserting the first ever, real time rendered and composed, full resolution/2k content to a movie in Trapped Ashes.
Poat currently serves as Creative Director at Amazon (company). He runs the company's nimble production lab for prototyping software and also hardware ideas.

Poat is the co-founder, producer and executive director of 300FISH, a mobile phone game company.

Poat is a speaker at various conferences including virtual reality, special effects and innovation and holds several patents in interactive storytelling.

Personal
Poat lives in San Francisco.

References

External links 

Living people
Syracuse University alumni
Year of birth missing (living people)